Nasser Menassel (born January 6, 1983, La Tronche, France) is a French former footballer of Algerian origin.

References

External links

1983 births
Living people
French footballers
French expatriate footballers
Association football midfielders
Grenoble Foot 38 players
Rodez AF players
Ligue 2 players
Expatriate footballers in Romania
French expatriate sportspeople in Romania
Liga I players
CS Otopeni players
FC Internațional Curtea de Argeș players
CS Pandurii Târgu Jiu players
FC Universitatea Cluj players
Liga II players
CS Sportul Snagov players
French sportspeople of Algerian descent
Enosis Neon Parekklisia FC players
Cypriot Second Division players
Expatriate footballers in Cyprus
French expatriate sportspeople in Cyprus
Sportspeople from La Tronche
Footballers from Auvergne-Rhône-Alpes